Charles West (1927) British crime novelist, is a former actor.  He studied acting at RADA and singing at Dartington Hall Music School. He was a member of the Old Vic Theatre Company 1958-1962 and subsequently  performed in 9 West End musicals in London, including Daddy Warbucks in Annie at Victoria Palace beginning in the 1970s and Don Quixote in Man of La Mancha at the Martin Beck Theater on Broadway. He wrote his first novel "Destruction Man", while acting in Australia. His Australian detective Paul Crook features in "Stonefish", "Stage Fright", "Little Ripper", and "The Long Hook". First married to Tona deBrett in 1954 and had three children, Jonathon, Stephen and Timothy. Later married to actress Julia West (a National Theatre company member who appeared in the film "Atonement"), he lives in Wallingford, Oxfordshire.

Bibliography
Destruction Man (1976)
Funnelweb (1989)
Little Ripper (1991)
Stonefish (1991)
Stage Fright (1993)
Little Devil (2006)
The Long Hook (2008)

References

External links

British crime fiction writers
English writers
People from Wallingford, Oxfordshire
English male stage actors
Possibly living people
1927 births
Alumni of RADA
Place of birth missing (living people)